"Maradona (kesä '86)" is a 2014 song by Finnish band Teflon Brothers. Released on 17 June 2014, the song peaked at number one on the Finnish Singles Chart.

Chart performance

References

2014 singles
Finnish-language songs
Teflon Brothers songs
2014 songs
Number-one singles in Finland
Songs about association football players
Songs about Argentina
Association football songs and chants
Cultural depictions of Diego Maradona